777 may refer to:

 777 (number), a number
 AD 777, a year of the Julian calendar
 777 BC, a year in the 8th century BC
 Boeing 777, a commercial jet airliner
 Boeing 777X, the newer generation of the Boeing 777.

Art and entertainment

Albums
 777 (AAA album), 2012 album by Japanese band AAA
 777 (DVD), 2007 DVD by Christian metalcore band Underoath
 777 (Jason Derulo album), an unreleased album by U.S. singer and songwriter Jason Derulo
 777 (Latto album), 2022
 777 (System 7 album), 1993 album by British electronic dance music group System 7
 777 – Cosmosophy, 2012 album by French black metal band Blut Aus Nord
 777 – Sect(s), 2011 album by Blut Aus Nord
 777 – The Desanctification, 2011 album by Blut Aus Nord
 777, 2010 album by Tonetta
 Danzig 777: I Luciferi, 2002 album by Danzig

Bands
 777 (band), original name of British ambient dance band System 7

Film
 777 Charlie, 2022 Indian Kannada-language film

Songs
 "777 (We Can Sing a Song!)", 2012 song by Japanese pop group AAA
 "777", a track on LP5 by Autechre
 "777", a track on Danzig II: Lucifuge by Danzig
 "777", a track on An Evening with Silk Sonic by Silk Sonic
 "777", a track on Nectar (Joji Album) by Joji

Other uses
 777 (cycling team), a Belgian cyclo-cross team
 777 and Other Qabalistic Writings of Aleister Crowley, a collection of papers written by Aleister Crowley
 British Rail Class 777, a train class of the Merseyrail network
 Caterpillar 777, an 80 tonne (100 st) rigid-frame off-road haul truck
 M777 howitzer, a towed artillery piece used by Australia, Canada, India, Saudi Arabia and the United States
 Minuscule 777, a Greek minuscule manuscript of the New Testament
 , a Russian brand of fortified wine
 Unit 777, an Egyptian Special Forces unit
 Full access file system permissions in Unix syntax
 Triple Seven, a winning line in slot machines
 "Triple 7", the train designation of "The Beast" in the 2010 film Unstoppable
 Triskelion symbol of the Afrikaner Weerstandsbeweging
 Derisive nickname for Carrie Lam, the fourth Chief Executive of Hong Kong elected with 777 votes

See also

 77 (disambiguation)
 7 (disambiguation)